Benoit Creek is a creek in Timiskaming District and Cochrane District in northeastern Ontario, Canada. It is in the James Bay drainage basin and is a left tributary of Woollings Creek.

The creek begins at Benoit Lake in geographic Black Township in the municipality of Black River-Matheson, Cochrane District and flows south to its mouth at Meyers Lake in geographic Lee Township in the Unorganized West Part of Timiskaming District. Meyers Lake flows via Woollings Creek, the Whiteclay River, the Black River, the Abitibi River and the Moose River to James Bay.

References

Other map sources:

Rivers of Timiskaming District
Rivers of Cochrane District